Sergio Wolmar Zavoli (21 September 1923 – 4 August 2020) was an Italian politician and journalist.

Biography
From 1947 to 1962, Zavoli worked as a radio journalist for RAI; later he also conducted some television programs.

He was president of the RAI from 1980 to 1986 and in 1981, he published his first book, Socialista di Dio, which won the Bancarella Award. Once he resigned as president, he continued both his television and literary career.

In 2001, he was elected Senator for the Democrats of the Left and held office until 2018.

For the "extraordinary contribution made to the cause of Italian journalism", on 26 March 2007, the Faculty of Letters and Philosophy of the University of Rome Tor Vergata awarded him an honorary degree in specialist publishing, multimedia communication and journalism.

He has also served as Chairman of the RAI Supervision Commission from 4 February 2009 until 14 March 2013, succeeded by Roberto Fico.

Zavoli died in Rome on August 4, 2020, aged 96.

References

1923 births
2020 deaths
People from Ravenna
21st-century Italian politicians
Italian journalists
Democrats of the Left politicians
Democratic Party (Italy) politicians